PalaSavelli is an indoor sporting arena located in Porto San Giorgio, Italy.  The capacity of the arena is 3,800 people. It is currently home of the Sutor Basket Montegranaro basketball team.

Indoor arenas in Italy
Basketball venues in Italy